Paul Horschig (born 1 March 2000) is a German footballer who plays as a defensive midfielder for Chemie Leipzig.

Career
Horschig made his professional debut for Erzgebirge Aue in the 2. Bundesliga on 19 May 2019, coming on as a substitute in the 84th minute for Clemens Fandrich in the away match against Darmstadt 98, which finished as a 0–1 loss. In August 2019, he joined VfB Auerbach in the Regionalliga Nordost for the 2019–20 season.

References

External links
 
 
 
 

2000 births
Living people
German footballers
Association football midfielders
FC Erzgebirge Aue players
VfB Auerbach players
BSG Chemie Leipzig (1997) players
2. Bundesliga players
Regionalliga players
21st-century German people